The Madeleine River (in French: rivière Madeleine) is a tributary on the south shore of the Saint-Camille Brook whose current flows successively into the Nicolet Southwest River, the Nicolet River, Lake Saint-Pierre and St. Lawrence River. Its course flows in the municipalities of Dudswell (MRC Le Haut-Saint-François Regional County Municipality and Saint-Camille, in the Les Sources Regional County Municipality (MRC), in the administrative region of Estrie, in Quebec, in Canada.

Geography 

The main neighboring hydrographic slopes of the Madeleine River are:
 north side: Saint-Camille Brook, Dion River;
 east side: Nicolet Centre River;
 south side Nicolet Southwest River;
 west side: Nicolet Southwest River.

The Madeleine River feeds from various agricultural and forest streams in an area south-east of the village of Saint-Camille. This head area is located southeast of the village of Saint-Camille, on the northeast side of rue Desrivières and northwest of chemin du ninth and tenth rank.

  southwesterly, in the municipality of Dudswell, to the municipal limit of Saint-Camille;
  towards the north-west, to the confluence of a stream (coming from the north-east);
  north-west, crossing rue Desrivières, passing south of the village of Saint-Camille, to rue Miquelon (route 216);
  towards the north-west, to its mouth.

The Madeleine river empties on the south bank of the Saint-Camille Brook which is a tributary of the Nicolet Southwest River.

Toponymy 
The term "Madeleine" constitutes a first name of French origin.

The toponym "Rivière Madeleine" was formalized on March 19, 1979, at the Commission de toponymie du Québec.

See also 
 List of rivers of Quebec

References 

Rivers of Estrie
Les Sources Regional County Municipality
Le Haut-Saint-François Regional County Municipality